Capistrano is a comune (municipality) in the Province of Vibo Valentia in the Italian region Calabria, located about  southwest of Catanzaro and about  east of Vibo Valentia.

The municipality of Capistrano contains the frazione (subdivision) Nicastrello.

Capistrano borders the following municipalities: Chiaravalle Centrale, Filogaso, Maierato, Monterosso Calabro, San Nicola da Crissa, San Vito sullo Ionio, Torre di Ruggiero.

Demographic evolution

References

External links
 web.tiscali.it/capistranovv/

Cities and towns in Calabria